Merizomena is a genus of beetles in the family Carabidae, containing the following species:

 Merizomena arabica (Mateu, 1986) 
 Merizomena basalis (Chaudoir, 1852) 
 Merizomena buettikeri (Mateu, 1986) 
 Merizomena castanea (Klug, 1832) 
 Merizomena dimidiata (Menetries, 1848) 
 Merizomena grandinella (Semenov, 1890) 
 Merizomena schoenemanni (Kirschenhofer, 1994) 
 Merizomena silvatica Mikhailov, 1977 
 Merizomena tricolor (Gebler, 1845) 
 Merizomena tschitscherini (Semenov, 1900) 
 Merizomena yemenita (Mateu, 1986)

References

Lebiinae